Camille Surdez (born 13 January 1998) is a Swiss footballer who plays as a forward for Swiss Women's Super League club FC Basel and the Switzerland national team.

Career

Club 
Camille Surdez started football at the age of 8 at FC Dombresson, in a boys' team. She then joined the juniors of FC Serrières, then FC Yverdon, with whom she made her debut in the National League A. She then joined BSC Young Boys.

In July 2018, Camille Surdez signed up for two years at the Girondins de Bordeaux.

National 
In 2016, she was part of the Swiss semi-finalist team for 2016 U19 European Championship.

References

1998 births
Living people
People from Franches-Montagnes District
Swiss women's footballers
Women's association football forwards
FC Girondins de Bordeaux (women) players
FC Basel Frauen players
Division 1 Féminine players
Switzerland women's international footballers
Swiss expatriate footballers
Swiss expatriate sportspeople in France
Expatriate women's footballers in France
Swiss Women's Super League players
Sportspeople from the canton of Jura